Luciferidae is a family of prawns. These prawns are small, characterised by bioluminescence and the loss or reduction of some appendages. They are predators of tiny planktonic crustaceans for which their third pereiopod is adapted to capture by having thick, curved spines covering the limb. Until recently, the family was thought to be monotypic, but a 2016 cladistic analysis recognized a second genus apart from Lucifer, named Belzebub.

References

Dendrobranchiata
Taxa named by Wilhem de Haan
Decapod families